Trenholm is an English surname of Norse origin. Another common variant is Trenholme.

Origin and variants 
Trenholm is a habitational name from the village of "Trenholme" near the market town of Stokesley in the county of North Yorkshire in the North of England. According to the Oxford Dictionary of English place names, it is derived from the pre-7th century Old Norse words "trani" meaning "crane," and "holmr," ("holm") meaning "islet" or "flat lands". It has also been proposed that the name could possibly be derived from Old Norse through the Old English words "trendel" meaning "fort" or "castle," and "holm."

First found in Yorkshire, the first bearers of the surname would have been from the village of Trenholme where they would have adopted the name as a habitational marker to identify themselves as natives of the village. This practice became very common as people started to leave their original homes to move to more distant locations, especially as the use of fixed surnames gradually became a legal necessity after the introduction of personal taxation.

A relatively rare surname, it is historically concentrated in the county in and around the districts of Hambleton, Redcar and Cleveland, Middlesbrough, and Stockton-on-Tees. Outside of England, variants of the surname can most commonly be found in Canada (most common) and the United States.

Until the gradual standardization of English spelling in the last few centuries, English lacked any comprehensive system of spelling. Consequently, spelling variations in names are frequently found in early Anglo-Saxon and later Anglo-Norman documents, meaning that a person's name was often spelled several different ways over a lifetime. As such, different variations of the Trenholm surname usually have the same origin.

Notable people with the surname
George Trenholm (1807-1876), South Carolina businessman, financier, politician, slaveowner and Confederate Secretary of the Treasury.
William L. Trenholm (1836-1901), Confederate Army veteran, United States Comptroller of the Currency (1886-1889), and president of the North American Trust Company (1898).

References

English-language surnames
Surnames of British Isles origin